Tillite Spur is a narrow, steep-cliffed rock spur, 3 nautical miles (6 km) long, descending from southern Wisconsin Plateau between Red Spur and Polygon Spur and terminating at the east side of Olentangy Glacier. Mapped by United States Geological Survey (USGS) from surveys and U.S. Navy air photos, 1960–64. The name was proposed by John H. Mercer, United States Antarctic Research Program (USARP) geologist to this area in 1964–65, because tillite extends the length of the spur above its granitic cliffs.

Ridges of Marie Byrd Land